
Gmina Łyszkowice is a rural gmina (administrative district) in Łowicz County, Łódź Voivodeship, in central Poland.

Villages
Gmina Łyszkowice contains the villages and settlements of Bobiecko, Bobrowa, Czatolin, Gzinka, Kalenice, Kuczków, Łagów, Łyszkowice, Łyszkowice-Kolonia, Nowe Grudze, Polesie, Seligów, Seroki, Stachlew, Stare Grudze, Trzcianka, Uchań Dolny, Uchań Górny, Wrzeczko and Zakulin.

Neighbouring gminas
Gmina Łyszkowice is bordered by the gminas of Dmosin, Domaniewice, Głowno, Lipce Reymontowskie, Łowicz, Maków, Nieborów and Skierniewice.

References
Polish official population figures 2006

Lyszkowice
Łowicz County